Eleanor Holland, Countess of Salisbury (1386 – after 1413), was an English noblewoman, the daughter of Thomas Holland, 2nd Earl of Kent, a half-brother of King Richard II of England. She was the first wife of Thomas Montagu, 4th Earl of Salisbury. One of her brothers was Edmund Holland, 4th Earl of Kent, to whom she was co-heiress. She is not to be confused with her eldest sister Alianore Holland, Countess of March who bore the same name.

Family
Lady Eleanor Holland was born in 1386 in Upholland, Lancashire, England, one of the ten children of Thomas Holland, 2nd Earl of Kent and Lady Alice FitzAlan, sister of Richard Fitzalan, 11th Earl of Arundel. Eleanor's eldest sister, Lady Alianore Holland, Countess of March who married Roger Mortimer, 4th Earl of March shared the same name. They were named after their maternal grandmother. Eleanor's father was the half-brother of King Richard II. Her eldest brother Thomas Holland, 1st Duke of Surrey was beheaded in 1400 by a mob of angry citizens at Cirencester for his role in the Epiphany Rising, which was aimed against the life of King Henry IV of England, who had usurped the throne of King Richard. Thomas's heir to the earldom of Kent was her second eldest brother Edmund Holland, to whom Eleanor became co-heiress. 

Her paternal grandparents were Thomas Holland, 1st Earl of Kent and Joan of Kent, who was the mother of King Richard by her second marriage to Edward, the Black Prince; and her maternal grandparents were Richard Fitzalan, 10th Earl of Arundel and Eleanor of Lancaster.

Marriage and issue
Lady Eleanor married Sir Thomas Montagu, son of John Montagu, 3rd Earl of Salisbury and Maud Francis, on 23 May 1399, as his first wife. She was about thirteen years old at the time of her marriage. Thomas would later become one of the most important commanders in the Hundred Years War. Eleanor did not assume the title of Countess of Salisbury until 14 June 1409, when the title, Earl of Salisbury, was nominally restored to Thomas. An attainder had been placed on his father's title and estates following his execution for his participation in the Epiphany Rising in 1400 alongside Eleanor's brother, Thomas. Eleanor's uncle John Holland, 1st Duke of Exeter had also been part of the conspiracy but he had escaped the mob only to be captured in Essex and decapitated on the orders of her maternal aunt Joan Fitzalan, mother-in-law of King Henry IV.

Thomas and Eleanor made their home at Bisham Manor in Berkshire. Together they had one daughter:
 Alice Montagu, 5th Countess of Salisbury (1407-3 April/9 December 1462), married in 1420, Richard Neville, by whom she had ten surviving children.

Eleanor died on an unknown date sometime after 1413. She was buried in Bisham Priory.<ref>Charles Cawley, Medieval Lands, Earls of Kent 1352–1408 (Holand)</ref>

Thomas married secondly before 1424, Alice Chaucer, granddaughter of the noted author Geoffrey Chaucer, but their marriage was childless. He was mortally wounded on 27 October 1428 at the Siege of Orléans and died several days later on 3 November. 

Alice, the daughter of Thomas and Eleanor, succeeded her father as suo jure'' 5th Countess of Salisbury. Through Alice, Eleanor was the grandmother of Richard Neville, 16th Earl of Warwick and great-grandmother of Cecily Bonville, who became one of the wealthiest English heiresses in the 15th century. Eleanor was also the great-great-great-grandmother of queen consort Catherine Parr, the sixth and final wife of King Henry VIII.

Ancestry

References

1386 births
15th-century deaths
English countesses
Daughters of British earls
People from Up Holland
Eleanor
Eleanor
Burials at Bisham Abbey
14th-century English women 
14th-century English people 
15th-century English women 
15th-century English people
Date of death unknown
Year of death unknown